Henryana is a monotypic  Nearctic and Neotropical genus of Hymenopteran insects of the family Eulophidae.

References
Key to Nearctic eulophid genera 
Universal Chalcidoidea Database 

Eulophidae